Arthur Heinrich Wilhelm Fitger  (4 October 184028 June 1909) was a German painter, art critic, playwright and poet.

Biography
Arthur Fitger was one of the ten children of Delmenhorst (Grand Duchy of Oldenburg) postmaster Ratsherr Peter Diedrich Fitger (born 29 February 1804, died 14 November 1865). Ratsherr was a hereditary title granted to his grandfather Heinrich Fitger and lineal male descendants (Fitger; see Salic law) since battlefield action in the Seven Years' War. Peter's wife was Clara Maria Caroline Plate (born 29 May 1815, died 18 November 1891), whose mother, Caroline (Arthur's grandmother), was raised the daughter of a Holstein Countess Reventlow on the Noer estate and married Court Counsellor Franz Plate in 1800 in Eutin. At the time of her marriage to Arthur's father, Clara Maria Caroline was widowed (Dony) with two daughters.

Arthur Fitger grew up in the grand ducal Posthaus in Delmenhorst which was also an inn which functioned as stopover for change of horses (postillions) and postal/customs exchange between Oldenburg and Bremen (part of the Thurn und Taxis network of the Holy Roman Empire).  His younger brother Emil Fitger (born 15 December 1848 in Delmenhorst, died 9 April 1917 in Bremen) was editor in chief of the Weser-Zeitung in Bremen for many years. Arthur Fitger attended the Volks- und Rektorschule in Delmenhorst and then the gymnasium in Oldenburg, where he lived at the home of Baurat Otto Lasius (1797–1888).

Painting
In 1858, Fitger went to the Akademie zu München, where he studied under Moritz von Schwind (1804–1875), Peter von Cornelius (1783–1867) and Bonaventura Genelli (1798–1868). He went to Antwerp in 1861 and then to Paris. From 1863 to 1865, he stayed in Rome, supported by a scholarship from Oldenburg's grand duke. Then he spent the following years alternately in Vienna und Berlin before moving to Bremen in 1869.

Fitger became known for his large decorative works, executed chiefly at Bremen. He decorated the Rembertikirche with two pictures:  "The lost son" and "The Merciful Samaritan." He did a frieze for the bourse with maritime allegories. His works also appeared in the Haus Seefahrt and the Reichspostgebäude. Influenced by the Franco-Prussian War in 1870, he produced the portable artwork "Barbarossa's Awakening," which spread his reputation further. In 1875, he was given the task of decorating the Ratskeller with murals. From 1883 to 1884 he painted large murals in the Kunsthalle Hamburg. After this he returned to Bremen where he painted murals of nymphs and centaurs in Imperial Hall of the new Imperial Post Office Building.

Originally painting in the style of Cornelius and Genelli, he later used colour in a more modern manner, similar to Hans Makart (1840–1884). Arthur Fitger was awarded a gold medal for his "Icarus" painting when exhibited at the 1892-1893 Chicago World's Fair (Columbian Exhibition)

Writing
Fitger was also well known for his writing. His plays, Adalbert von Bremen (Oldenburg 1873; 2nd edition with the sequel Hie Reich! Hie Rom! ["Here Empire! Here Rome!"], 1875), Die Hexe ("The witch," Oldenburg, 1878; 4th edition, 1885), Von Gottes Gnaden ("From the grace of God," 2nd edition, Oldenburg, 1884) have often been performed. He also wrote Albrecht Dürer, Johann Kepler and Michelangelo and the epic poem Roland und die Rose (1871) for the Bremer Künstlerverein. Fitger's most important written works are the poetry collections Fahrendes Volk ("Traveling people," 2nd edition, Oldenburg, 1883) und Winternächte ("Winter nights," Oldenburg, 1880). He also rendered into German (1886) Lord Byron's Marino Faliero, and for the Denkmale der Geschichte und Kunst Bremens ("Memorials of the history and art of Bremen," 1877) prepared a history of the local cathedral.

Art criticism
Fitger was regarded as an important person in art in Bremen around 1900. His art criticisms, published in the press, had a lasting influence on Hanseatic taste in art. He was chairman of the Kunstverein, and kept a conservative outlook on art. He strongly criticised artists who followed fashions that were modern at that time, including the Künstlerkolonie Worpswede and the contemporary French painters.
The most striking example of his criticism was a comment on an attempt by Marie Bock and Paula Becker to exhibit in the Kunsthalle Bremen at the end of 1899. It appeared in the Weser-Zeitung, which was edited by his brother, Emil, at the time:

which means:

However, his criticism was unable to prevent a breakthrough of the Künstlerkolonie Worpswede.

See also
 List of German painters

Notes

References
 Meyers Konversations-Lexikon, 4th edition from 1888–1890.

Further reading
 Ulrich Thieme/Felix Becker (Begr.): Allgemeines Lexikon der bildenden Künste von der Antike bis zur Gegenwart. Band 12, Leipzig 1916, page 58
 Hans Friedl u.a. (Hrsg.): Biographisches Lexikon zur Geschichte des Landes Oldenburg. Oldenburg 1992, pages 194–196
 Georg von Lindern: Arthur Fitger Maler und Dichter 1840 -1909 Heimatverein Delmenhorst 1962
 Gerhard Wietek: 200 Jahre Malerei im Oldenburger Land 
 Lilienthaler Kunststiftung: ...und sie malten doch!

External links
 
 Short biography
 

19th-century German painters
German male painters
20th-century German painters
20th-century German male artists
German poets
German art critics
1840 births
1909 deaths
People from Delmenhorst
German male poets
German male dramatists and playwrights
19th-century German poets
19th-century German dramatists and playwrights
19th-century German male writers
German male non-fiction writers
19th-century German male artists